Esteban Valera Beltré (born December 26, 1967) is a former shortstop in Major League Baseball who played for the Chicago White Sox (1991–1992), Texas Rangers (1994–1995) and Boston Red Sox (1996). He batted and threw right-handed.

Early life
Beltré was born in Ingenio Quisqueya, Dominican Republic.

Career
In a five-season career, Beltré posted a .237 batting average (95-for-401) with one home run and 35 RBI in 186 games played.

See also
Players from Dominican Republic in MLB

References

External links
 , or Retrosheet

1967 births
Boston Red Sox players
Calgary Expos players
Charlotte Knights players
Chicago White Sox players
Dominican Republic expatriate baseball players in Canada
Dominican Republic expatriate baseball players in the United States
Texas Rangers players
Living people
Major League Baseball players from the Dominican Republic
Major League Baseball shortstops
Nashville Sounds players
Richmond Braves players
St. Paul Saints players
Toros del Este players
Jacksonville Expos players
Denver Zephyrs players
Indianapolis Indians players
Rochester Red Wings players
Rockford Expos players
Salt Lake Buzz players
Scranton/Wilkes-Barre Red Barons players
Tucson Sidewinders players
Utica Blue Sox players
Vancouver Canadians players
West Palm Beach Expos players